The Journal of Surveying Engineering is a quarterly peer-reviewed scientific journal published by the American Society of Civil Engineers. It covers traditional areas of surveying and mapping, as well as new developments such as satellite positioning and navigation, computer applications, and digital mapping. It was established in 1956 (when ASCE Transactions was split into 12 technical journals).

Abstracting and indexing
The journal abstracted and indexed in the Emerging Sources Citation Index and Scopus.

Current Editorial Broad

Editor:
Michael J. Olsen, Ph.D., M.ASCE, Oregon State University

Associate Editor:

Alireza Amiri-Simkooei, Ph.D., University of Isfahan

Sergio Baselga, Ph.D., M.ASCE, Universidad Politécnica de Valencia

Said M. Easa, Ph.D., P.E., M.ASCE, Ryerson University, 

Toronto
Craig Glennie, Ph.D., P.E., University of Houston

Jen-Yu Han, Ph.D., M.ASCE, National Taiwan University

Editorial Board:

Bishwa N. Acharya, Ph.D., M.ASCE, EMI, Inc.
James M. Anderson, Ph.D., P.E., P.L.S., University of California, Berkeley
David Belton, Curtin University
Michael L. Dennis, Ph.D., P.E., R.L.S., M.ASCE, National Geodetic Survey
Robert Duchnowski, University of Warmia and Mazury in Olsztyn
Ahmed F. Elaksher, Ph.D., P.L.S., New Mexico State University
Andrew C. Kellie, P.L.S., M.ASCE, Murray State University
Andrzej Kobryń, Bialystok University of Technology
Thomas H. Meyer, Ph.D., M.ASCE, University of Connecticut
Chris Parrish, Aff.M.ASCE, Oregon State University
Jacek Paziewski, Ph.D., University of Warmia and Mazury in Olsztyn
Elena Rangelova, Ph.D., P.Eng., University of Calgary
David A. Rolbiecki, P.L.S., M.ASCE, State of Texas Adjutant General’s Department
Michael Starek, Ph.D., M.ASCE, Texas A&M University, Corpus Christi
Ergin Tari, Ph.D., Istanbul Technical University
Guoquan Wang, Ph.D., M.ASCE, University of Houston
Benjamin E. Wilkinson, Ph.D., University of Florida

Book Review Editor:
Boudewijn H.W. van Gelder, Ph.D., M.ASCE, Purdue University

References

External links

Engineering journals
American Society of Civil Engineers academic journals
Quarterly journals
English-language journals
Publications established in 1873
Surveying